The Nikon D3500 is an entry-level 24.2-megapixel DX format DSLR Nikon F-mount camera announced by Nikon on August 30, 2018. The D3500 is available with two kits: with an 18-55mm lens for $499.95 and a two lens kit (18-55mm and 70-300mm lenses) for $849.95. It succeeds the Nikon D3400. In 2019, the D3500 won the TIPA Best DSLR Camera award.

Features 
The D3500 has the following features:
 
 24.2-megapixel CMOS image sensor.
 Active D-Lighting.
 Full HD and HD video recording (up to 60 frames/s).
 Up to 5 frames per second continuous shooting.
 ISO sensitivity 100 to 25,600.
 11-point 3D Tracking Multi-CAM 1000 autofocus sensor module.
 3D Color Matrix Metering II (only compatible with type-G and E lenses).
 Bluetooth connectivity, but Wi-Fi not equipped.
 Compatible with Nikon's SnapBridge app.

Predecessor comparison 
The Nikon D3500 is the successor to the Nikon D3400 that was introduced on August 17, 2016, with the following improvements.
 45 g lighter body (415 g VS 460 g).
 Longer battery life (1500 Shots VS 1200 Shots).
 Improved deeper grip.
 New button layout.

References

External links

D3500
D3500
Cameras introduced in 2018
Cameras made in Thailand